The 2017 North Yorkshire County Council election was held on 4 May 2017 as part of the 2017 local elections in the United Kingdom. All 72 councillors were elected from 68 electoral divisions which each returned either one or two county councillors by first-past-the-post voting for a four-year term of office.

Results

Divisional results

Craven district (7 seats)

Hambleton district (11 seats)

Harrogate district (18 seats)

Andrew Goss was originally elected as a member of the Liberal Democrats in the 2013 North Yorkshire County Council election, however he left the party and proceeded to stand as an independent. The reflected change in the vote for Goss is taken from his vote share as a Liberal Democrat candidate in 2013.

Richmondshire district (6 seats)

Ryedale district (6 seats)

Lindsay Burr was originally elected as a member of the Liberal Democrats in the 2013 North Yorkshire County Council election, however she left the party and proceeded to stand as an independent. The reflected change in the vote for Burr is taken from her vote share as a Liberal Democrat candidate in 2013.

Scarborough district (14 seats)

Selby district (9 seats)

By-elections between 2017 and 2022

References

2017
2017 English local elections
2010s in North Yorkshire